Immediacy may refer to:

 Immediacy, a concept in English law, see duress in English law
 Immediacy, a concept in vested interest (communication theory)
 Immediacy, a condition in the Buddhist Twelve Nidānas
 Immediacy (philosophy), a philosophical concept
 Immediacy, one of the  10 principles of the Burning Man event
 Imperial immediacy, in the Holy Roman Empire, the status of persons not subject to local lords but only to the emperor
 Immediacy index, a measure of the importance of published scientific articles

See also
 Immediate (disambiguation)